The Roman Catholic Diocese of Nanterre (Latin: Dioecesis Nemptodurensis; French: Diocèse de Nanterre) is a diocese of the Latin Church of the Roman Catholic Church in France. Erected in 1966, the diocese was split off from the Diocese of Versailles and the Archdiocese of Paris. Currently the diocese remains a suffragan of the Archdiocese of Paris.

Bishops 
Jacques Marie Delarue † (20 Nov 1966 Ordained – 23 August 1982 Died) 
François-Marie-Christian Favreau (1983 – 18 June 2002 Resigned) 
Gérard Antoine Daucourt (22 Sep 2002 Installed – 14 November 2013 Resigned)
Michel Christian Alain Aupetit (4 Apr 2014 Appointed – 7 dec 2017)
Matthieu Rougé (5 Jun 2018 Appointed - )

See also
 Catholic Church in France

References

External links 
  Centre national des Archives de l'Église de France, L’Épiscopat francais depuis 1919, retrieved: 2016-12-24. 
 http://www.catholic-hierarchy.org/diocese/dnanr.html 

Nanterre
1966 establishments in France